Anisoplaca cosmia, also known as the Norfolk Island hibiscus moth, is a species of moth in the family Gelechiidae. It was described by John David Bradley in 1956 and is native to Norfolk Island but has become established in New Zealand.

Taxonomy
This species was first described by John David Bradley in 1956 using a specimen caught while resting on a Norfolk Island Pine and named Anisoplaca cosmia. The male holotype specimen is held at the Natural History Museum, London.

Description
The wingspan is about 16 mm. The forewings are buff with diffused fuscous-black markings and with the anterior margin of the costa irrorated (speckled) with blackish. There is a blackish dash at four-fifths and a small black spot at the base, an ochreous-buff suffusion below the costa, four small black discal dot-like spots surrounded by whitish rings, as well as a fifth spot not surrounded by a whitish ring in the ochreous-buff suffusion below the costa. The hindwings are light grey.

This species is similar in appearance to the New Zealand species A. archyrota however can be distinguished as the labial palpus in A. cosmia is coloured fuscous-black to the top of the underside of the second segment where as in A. archyrota the labial palpus is only coloured fuscous-black for the bottom two thirds.

Distribution
This species is native to Norfolk Island but has become established in New Zealand where it has been recorded in Auckland, Hawkes Bay and Gisborne.

Hosts 

The larvae of this species feed on the fruits and shoots of Lagunaria patersonia.

References

Anisoplaca
Moths described in 1956
Moths of Australia
Moths of New Zealand